Digah (also, Digyakh and Dygya) is a village and municipality in the Masally Rayon of Azerbaijan.  It has a population of 3,722.

References 

Populated places in Masally District